Saoud Al-Ansari (born 16 September 1991) is a Kuwaiti footballer who played for Al-Qadsia as a defender.

References 

1991 births
Living people
Kuwaiti footballers
Association football defenders
Kuwait international footballers
Sportspeople from Kuwait City
Kazma SC players
Qadsia SC players
Kuwait Premier League players